Lamelloporus is a fungal genus in the family Steccherinaceae (formerly classified in the Meruliaceae). It is a monotypic genus, containing the single species Lamelloporus americanus. The genus and species were described by Norwegian mycologist Leif Ryvarden in 1987. This fungus is known from tropical America, including Mexico and Venezuela.

References

Fungi of Mexico
Fungi of South America
Steccherinaceae
Monotypic Polyporales genera
Taxa named by Leif Ryvarden
Taxa described in 1987
Fungi without expected TNC conservation status